Coaches of the Pac-12 Conference bestow the following awards at the end of each football season. The conference was founded in its current form as the Athletic Association of Western Universities in 1959, but traces its roots to the Pacific Coast Conference, founded in 1915. The conference name  changed to Pacific-8 Conference (Pac-8) in 1968 and  Pacific-10 Conference (Pac-10) in 1978. The conference's 2011 expansion to 12 members saw the conference formally renamed as the Pac-12 Conference.

Player of the Year
The following are the conference's various Player of the Year award recipients. In 2004 the Defensive Player of the Year award was renamed the Pat Tillman Defensive Player of the Year.

Pop Warner Trophy
The Glenn "Pop" Warner Memorial Trophy was awarded annually by the Palo Club to the most valuable senior player on the West Coast.  It was awarded from 1949 to 2004.  Notably, all but 5 recipients played for Pac-10 institutions.  The award is distinguished from the unaffiliated W. J. Voit Memorial Trophy, presented annually from 1951 to 1978 to the top player on the Pacific Coast regardless of class-year.

Morris Trophy
The Morris Trophy is awarded annually to the best offensive and defensive linemen in the conference, as selected by opposing players.

Offense

Defense

Coach of the Year
The following coach were selected as coach of the year.

See also
List of All-Pac-12 Conference football teams

References

External links
 Morris Trophy official website

Official Pac-10 announcements
 2005 Pac-10 Football Awards and All-Conference Team Announced
 2006 Pac-10 Football Awards and All-Conference Team Announced
 2007 Pac-10 Football Awards and All-Conference Team Announced
 Pac-10 Announces 2008 All-Conference Football Awards
 2010 Pac-10 Football Awards and All-Conference Team Announced

College football conference awards and honors
Awards